Ralph Packet (born 17 July 1990) is a Belgian politician from the New Flemish Alliance.

References 

Living people
1990 births
People from Etterbeek

MEPs for Belgium 2014–2019
New Flemish Alliance politicians
Flemish politicians
21st-century Belgian politicians